The 1966 Blue Swords was an international senior-level figure skating competition organized in Karl-Marx-Stadt, East Germany. Medals were awarded in the disciplines of men's singles, ladies' singles, pair skating and ice dancing. East German national champion Günter Zöller won the first of his four consecutive Blue Swords titles, defeating Czechoslovakia's Marian Filc and West Germany's Reinhard Ketterer. East Germans swept the ladies' and pairs' podiums, led by Gabriele Seyfert, who won her fourth straight gold medal at the event, and Heidemarie Steiner / Heinz-Ulrich Walther. Annerose Baier / Eberhard Rüger won gold ahead of the Soviet Union's Lyudmila Pakhomova / Aleksandr Gorshkov and British duo Susan Getty / Roy Bradshaw.

Results

Men

Ladies

Pairs

Ice dancing 

Blue Swords
Blud e Swords